Yankees is an album of improvised music by Derek Bailey, John Zorn & George Lewis. The album was released as an LP by Celluloid in 1983 and was reissued on CD by Celluloid (from a vinyl source) and Charly (from the original master tape). It was the first recorded meeting of John Zorn and Derek Bailey. The two men would later release the album, Harras, with William Parker in 1993. Zorn and Lewis would collaborate further on News for Lulu (1988) and More News for Lulu (1993) with Bill Frisell.

Reception

The AllMusic review by "Blue" Gene Tyranny awarded the album 4 stars calling it "Subtle, droll, hilarious takes on the trivia of baseball sounds".

The Penguin Guide to Jazz observed: "Though a collaborative effort, this more and more feels like a Zorn project. It is one of the great improvisation records of the decade and is a key item in what turned out to be a vintage year... A record to cherish".

Track listing
All compositions by Bailey/Lewis/Zorn
 "City, City, City" – 8:29
 "The Legend of Enos Slaughter" – 9:27
 "Who's on First?" – 3:15
 "On Golden Pond" – 17:49
 "The Warning Track" – 5:47

Personnel
Derek Bailey – guitar
George Lewis – trombone
John Zorn – alto saxophone

References

1983 albums
John Zorn albums
Derek Bailey (guitarist) albums
George E. Lewis albums
Albums produced by John Zorn
Celluloid Records albums